Steven R. Smith is an American musician, instrument-builder, and printmaker often associated with the Jewelled Antler collective. Born in Fullerton, California and based in San Francisco and, more recently, Los Angeles, he has been musically active since the mid-1990s. His main instrument is guitar, both acoustic and electric, although other instruments, including the hurdy-gurdy, bouzouki, fretted spike fiddles, and assorted ethnic instruments, have been incorporated into his work. 

Smith’s music tends to range from dense, orchestrated pieces to sparse solo excursions on electric guitar and is improvised as often as composed. His music has drawn elements from psychedelic rock, traditional folk music, soundtracks, free jazz, and modern composers, and tends to be contemplative and somewhat mournful. Some of his records feature elaborate packaging, woodcut and linocut prints, and handmade chapbooks. Throughout his career Smith has recorded for a number of independent labels such as Important Records, Soft Abuse, Catsup Plate, Root Strata, Immune Recordings, Last Visible Dog, Jewelled Antler, Darla Records, and Emperor Jones.

In addition to his ongoing solo work, Smith has been a member of the instrumental psych-rock group Mirza; the improvisational group Thuja; Hala Strana, a project which focuses on the traditional music of Eastern Europe; and most recently Ulaan Passerine, Ulaan Markhor, and Ulaan Khol. Smith occasionally appeared live with Mirza and Thuja, but he remains an elusive solo performer.

Discography

steven r. smith
 log the man dead – CS (autopia, 1995)
 gehenna belvedere – LP (autopia, 1996)
 autumn is the end – CD (darla, 1998)
 from ashes come – CD (3 acre floor, 1999)
 slate branches – CD (3 acre floor, 2000), LP (little brother records, 2000)
 death of last year's man e.p. – 7” (autopia, 2000), CDep (emperor jones, 2001)
 tableland – CD (emperor jones, 2001)
 lineaments – CD (emperor jones, 2002)
 kohl – CDr (jewelled antler, 2002), LP (emperor jones, 2005)
 antimony – CDr (digitalis industries, 2004)
 crown of marches – CD (catsup plate, 2005)
 the anchorite - LP (important records, 2006), CD (root strata, 2008)
 owl - CD (digitalis industries, 2007)
 cities - LP (immune recordings, 2009)
 floor of the sky e.p. - LP (burnt toast vinyl, 2011)
 old skete - LP (worstward recordings, 2011)
 ending/returning - 2xLP (immune recordings, 2013)
 a sketchbook of endings -- lp/cd (soft abuse, 2019)
 the loss of what we keep e.p. -- dl (worstward recordings, 2019)
 in the spires -- lp (cold moon records, 2021)
 the growing surface e.p. -- dl (worstward recordings, 2021)
 spring -- lp (soft abuse, 2022)

hala strana
 karst e.p. – 3”CDr (jewelled antler, 2003)
 hala strana – CD (emperor jones, 2003), LP (desastre, 2017)
 fielding – 2xCDr (jewelled antler, 2003), 2xCD (last visible dog, 2004), 2xLP (worstward/desastre 2020)
 these villages – CD (soft abuse, 2004)
 white sleep - lathe cut 7" (soft abuse, 2006)
 heave the gambrel roof - LP/CD (music fellowship, 2007)
 compendium - dl (worstward recordings, 2011)
 hala strana boxset - 5xcs box set (cabin floor esoterica, 2014)

ulaan janthina
 ulaan janthina (part I) -- cs (worstward recordings, 2020)
 ulaan janthina (part II) -- cs (worstward recordings, 2020)

ulaan passerine
 ulaan passerine - 2xcs (brave mysteries, 2013); cd (worstward recordings, 2014)
 byzantium crow - cd (worstward recordings, 2014)
 light in dust e.p. - 10" (worstward recordings, 2015)
 the great unwinding - 2xcs (worstward recordings, 2016)
 moss cathedral - cs (worstward recordings, 2016)
 the landscape of memory - lp (worstward recordings, 2017)
 new evening -- lp (worstward recordings, 2019)
 crow/olive -- 7" (samaritan press, 2020)
 fragments -- dl (worstward recordings, 2020
 sun spar -- lp (worstward recordings, 2022)
 dawn -- lp (worstward recordings, 2023)

ulaan markhor
 ulaan markhor - cd/lp (soft abuse, 2012)
 spiral horns, black onions et al. - lp (soft abuse, 2014)
 detritus: 2010-2016 - dl (worstward recordings, 2016)
 helm -- cs (soft abuse, 2018)

ulaan khol
 I – CD (soft abuse, 2008)
 II – CD (soft abuse, 2008)
 III – CD (soft abuse, 2010)
 la catacomb - CS (soft abuse, 2011)
 los angeles e.p. - dl (worstward recordings, 2012)
 ending/returning - 2xlp (immune recordings, 2013)
 salt - CS (soft abuse, 2015)
 collapsing hymns -- cs (worstward recordings, 2019)
 milk thistle -- cs (desastre, 2023)

thuja
 the deer lay down their bones – CD (tumult, 2000)
 ghost plants – CD (emperor jones, 2002)
 museum #1 – 3”CDr (jewelled antler, 2002)
 museum #2 – 3”CDr (jewelled antler, 2002)
 hills – CDr (last visible dog, 2002), lp (rose hobart, 2019)
 suns – CD (emperor jones, 2002)
 all strange beasts of the past – CD (emperor jones, 2003)
 fable – 3”CD (jewelled antler, 2003)
 pine cone temples – 2xCD (strange attractors, 2005)
 thuja – LP (Important, 2008)

mirza
 mirza – 12”ep (autopia, 1996)
 anadromous – CD (darla, 1997)
 iron compass flux – 2xLP/CD (darla, 1998)
 last clouds – CD (ba da bing!, 2001)

43 odes
 43 odes - cs (eiderdown recordings, 2019)

References

External links
 Official site
 Steven R. Smith at Emperor Jones
 [ Steven R. Smith at Allmusic]
 Worstward Recordings Bandcamp site

Year of birth missing (living people)
Living people
American experimental guitarists
American male guitarists
American folk guitarists
American multi-instrumentalists
Psychedelic folk musicians
Darla Records artists